August House is an independent children's book publisher established in 1978 and currently headquartered in Atlanta, Georgia. August House principally focuses on publishing children's folktales, picture books, early-grade chapter books, and storytelling resource materials. August House also manages two imprints: Story Cove, an interactive picture book and multimedia series geared towards helping teachers meet classroom Common Core Standards for reading, and LittleFolk, August House's picture book line.

August House is home to authors Margaret Read MacDonald, Donald Davis, Martha Hamilton, Mitch Weiss, Willy Claflin, Heather Forest, Rob Cleveland, W. C. Jameson, and Pleasant DeSpain, among others, as well as the award-winning picture-book series Maynard Moose.

Origins
August House was founded in Little Rock, Arkansas by Ted Parkhurst and Jon Looney as a publisher of Arkansas poetry. In 1986, August House began to collaborate with Liz Parkhurst and W.K. McNeil and develop as a folklore publisher. By 1989, August House established a partnership with the National Storytelling Festival and began to regularly publish works by professional storytellers. The company was purchased in 2004 by Steve Floyd and Graham Anthony of Marsh Cove Productions, who expanded August House's LittleFolk picture book line, established the Story Cove imprint, and moved the headquarters to Atlanta, Georgia. Since then, the company has continued to build and expand its collection of folktales and stories from the oral tradition.

Imprints
 Story Cove: publishes leveled picture books with supplemental video animations, read-along recordings, lesson plans, and activities to build reading skills needed to meet Common Core Standards.
 LittleFolk: publishes picture books by authors Margaret Read MacDonald, Martha Hamilton, Mitch Weiss, Heather Forest, and others. LittleFolk titles include illustrations from artists Susan Gaber, Julie Paschkis, James Stimson, Don Tate, Peter Thornton, Geraldo Valério, and others.

Publications

References

External links
August House
Story Cove

Book publishing companies of the United States
1978 establishments in the United States
Companies based in Atlanta
Publishing companies established in 1978
Children's book publishers
Literary publishing companies